Bhakthajanangalude Sradhakku (For the attention of devotees) is a 2011 Indian Malayalam-language satirical drama film directed by Priyanandanan and written by Manoj from a story by Ranjith. It stars Kavya Madhavan and Irshad. The film narrates the story of a self-declared demigod and her alcoholic husband. It is reportedly inspired from the life of the controversial godwoman Divya Joshi. The movie is produced by Jahangir Shamz under the banner of xarfnet movies.

Plot

Sumangala is married to a government employee named Viswanathan. Viswanathan is committed to his family, which includes their two children and his mother. Things go horribly wrong when he becomes an alcoholic. Fed up with her husband's incorrigible ways, Sumangala is forced to become a godwoman. This forms the turning point in the film.

Cast
 Kavya Madhavan as Sumangala
 Irshad as Viswanathan
 Vanitha Krishnachandran as Saradha
 Kalabhavan Mani as Ammavan  
 Jagadeesh
 Salim Kumar
 Sadiq
 Augustine
 Indrans
 Jijoy Rajagopal

Production
Priyanandan announced the film soon after his Prithviraj Sukumaran-Kavya Madhavan starrer Mandarappoovalla got shelved. The songs recorded for Mandarappoovalla are used in this film. The film was shot at various parts of Kannur.

References

2010s Malayalam-language films
2011 films
2011 comedy-drama films
Indian comedy-drama films
Indian satirical films
Films about alcoholism
Films shot in Kannur
Films directed by Priyanandanan
2010s satirical films